Just a Little Love is the seventh studio album by American country music artist Reba McEntire. It was released on April 2, 1984, as her first album for MCA Nashville. The album's singles were its title track and  "He Broke Your Memory Last Night." Both songs charted on Hot Country Songs, with the former reaching #5 and the latter reaching #15.

Track listing

Personnel 
Adapted from the AllMusic credits.

 Reba McEntire – lead and backing vocals
 David Briggs – keyboards
 Gary Prim – keyboards
 Shane Keister – synthesizers
 Brent Rowan – lead guitar
 Billy Sanford – lead guitar
 Chip Young – rhythm guitar 
 Weldon Myrick – steel guitar
 David Hungate – bass
 Bob Wray – bass
 Jerry Kroon – drums
 Larrie Londin – drums
 James Stroud – drums
 Farrell Morris – percussion
 Terry McMillan – harmonica
 Bergen White – string arrangements
 The A-Strings – strings

Production 
 Norro Wilson – producer
 Bill Harris – engineer, mixing 
 Doug Crider – assistant engineer
 Milan Bogdan – digital editing
 Glenn Meadows – mastering
 Disc Mastering (Nashville, Tennessee) – mastering location 
 Katie Gillon – project coordinator 
 Sherri Halford – project coordinator
 Simon Levy – art direction
 George Osaki – art direction, design 
 Mario Castilli – photography

Chart performance

Album

Singles

References

1984 albums
Reba McEntire albums
MCA Records albums
Albums produced by Norro Wilson